Graziano Di Prima (born 7 May 1994) is an Italian dancer and choreographer.

Career
Di Prima was born in Sicily.

He toured with Burn the Floor, UK in 2021 alongside other professional dancers and the Strictly Come Dancing the Professionals Live Tour in 2022.

Strictly Come Dancing
In 2018, the BBC announced that Di Prima would join the cast of professional dancers on the British television show Strictly Come Dancing. He was demoted the following year due to his height; as he personally announced that he was not getting a celebrity partner.

Di Prima has also appeared on a number of episodes of BBC Two's Strictly Come Dancing: It Takes Two with Zoë Ball. Di Prima is the current Guinness World Record holder for the most Botafogo steps, performing 90 steps in 30 seconds in a challenge held in December 2019. This record was achieved on It Takes Two with supervision by Guinness World Records.

Strictly Come Dancing Christmas Special
Di Prima danced with singer Anne-Marie for the 2021 Strictly Come Dancing Christmas Special, and won.

Highest and Lowest Scoring Per Dance

Series 16
Di Prima's first celebrity partner was radio DJ Vick Hope.

Score awarded by guest judge Alfonso Ribiero.

Series 19
Di Prima's second celebrity partner was comedian & Loose Women panellist Judi Love.

Series 20
Di Prima's third celebrity partner was actress & Morning Live presenter Kym Marsh.

Personal life 
Di Prima released his own calendar in 2020.

He married Giada Lini on 9th July 2022.

References

1994 births
Living people
Italian ballroom dancers
People from Sicily